Michele Valentini (born 9 June 1986) is an Italian professional footballer who plays as a midfielder. Valentini spent his entire career between the Italian Serie C and Serie D with 399 appearances across the competitions.

Club career
He began his career with Bellaria Igea in 2005, and from there had stints with Pavia, Sangiovannese, Valenzana, and Giacomense. He helped Teramo get promoted to the Serie C for the 2011–12 season. He then had stints at Alessandria, Campobasso, Santarcangelo, and Imolese who he also helped promoted to Serie C as their captain. Finally, he moved to Mantova, and Clodiense.

References

External links
 
 

1986 births
Living people
People from Cesena
Italian footballers
A.C. Bellaria Igea Marina players
F.C. Pavia players
Mantova 1911 players
U.S. Alessandria Calcio 1912 players
Serie C players
Serie D players
Association football midfielders
Footballers from Emilia-Romagna
Sportspeople from the Province of Forlì-Cesena